St. Mary's Higher Secondary School, established in 1924, is one of the oldest schools in Assam, India. It is situated in M.C. Road, Guwahati. The school is affiliated to Secondary Education Board of Assam. Sr. Tessy Davis is the current principal.

History 
When the school was established in 1924, it was managed by six sisters - Sr. Innocenza Vallino, Sr. Cecilia Da Roit, Sr. Clotilde Appiano, Sr. Maria Bricarello, Sr. Rosetti Antonietta and Sr. Giulia Berra.

Past Superiors 

 Sr. Innocenza Vallino
 Sr. Maria Avio
 Sr. Clotilde Appiano
 Sr. Luigina Saletta
 Sr. Clotilde Appiano
 Sr. Teresa Villa
 Sr. Francesca Martina
 Sr. Severina Schiapparelli
 Sr. Clotilde Appiano
 Sr. Cleofe Fassa
 Sr. Margaret Greppi
 Sr. Lydia Dias
 Sr. Rosy Devassy
 Sr. Margaret Greppi
 Sr. Rosy Devassy
 Sr. Mary Mampilly
 Sr. Celine Michael
 Sr. Annie Adichirayil
 Sr. Alphonsa Kurisinkal
 Sr. Lucy Rose Ozhukayil
 Sr. Grace Ottalankal
 Sr. Bridget Chittappanattu

Past Headmistress/Principals 

 Sr. Catherine Susngi
 Sr. Lydia Dias
 Sr. Maria Rodrigues
 Sr. Rosy Devassy
 Sr. Anna Varkey
 Sr. Beatrice Gonsalves
 Sr. Mary George
 Sr. Bridget Kurian
 Sr. Mary Parekatt
 Sr. Ivy D’Souza
 Sr. Elizabeth Joseph
 Sr. Teresa Kurian
 Sr. Elizabeth George
 Sr. Celine Porinchu
 Sr. Catherine Kanannampuzha
 Sr. Annie Villuviruthil
 Sr. Lucy Nedumala
 Sr. Jessy Nedumala
 Sr. (Dr) Molly Kaniampadickal
 Sr. Kathreena Kannapuzha

Famous past pupils 

 Riniki Bhuyan Sarma
 Monalisa Baruah Mehta

Rank Holders in State wise School final Exams

2019 

 Pratyasha Medhi : 2nd
 Anushree Bhuyan : 3rd
 Christie Saikia : 4th

References

External Website 
Official website of St. Mary's Higher Secondary School, Chenikuthi, Guwahati

High schools and secondary schools in Assam
Schools in Guwahati
Christian schools in Assam
Educational institutions established in 1924
1924 establishments in India